Bulgarian Communist Party – Marxists, abbreviated BCP-Marxists is a communist party in Bulgaria, founded in 1990. The chairman of the Executive Committee of the party is Boris Petkov.

BCP-M took part in the 1991 parliamentary elections. It got 7663 votes (0.14%).

The BCP-M has close ties with the Workers' Party of Korea.

References 

Communist parties in Bulgaria
Marxist parties in Bulgaria
Political parties established in 1990
1990 establishments in Bulgaria